Joris Willem Eelco Tjebbes  (5 November 1929, in Vlissingen – 31 July 2001, in Hoogeveen) was a Dutch freestyle swimmer. He won a bronze medal at the 1950 European Aquatics Championships and competed at the 1952 Summer Olympics. Between 1950 and 1952, Tjebbes was the national champion in the 100 m and 400 m and set nine national records in the 100 m, 200 m and 400 m freestyle events.

References

1929 births
2001 deaths
Dutch male freestyle swimmers
Olympic swimmers of the Netherlands
European Aquatics Championships medalists in swimming
Swimmers at the 1952 Summer Olympics
Sportspeople from Vlissingen